The Horace T. Robles House is a historic U.S. home in Tampa, Florida. It is located at 2604 East Hanna Avenue. On March 2, 2006, it was added to the U.S. National Register of Historic Places.  The house currently functions as the leasing office for an apartment complex.

References

External links
 Weekly List Of Actions Taken On Properties: 2/27/06 through 3/03/06 at National Register of Historic Places

Houses on the National Register of Historic Places in Hillsborough County, Florida